Everson Mono is a monospaced humanist sans serif Unicode font whose development by Michael Everson began in 1995. At first, Everson Mono was a collection of 8-bit fonts containing glyphs for tables in ISO/IEC 10646; at that time, it was not easy to edit cmaps to have true Unicode indices, and there were very few applications which could do anything with a font so encoded in any case. The original "Everson Mono" had a MacRoman character set, and other versions were named with suffixes: "Everson Mono Latin B", "Everson Mono Currency", "Everson Mono Armenian" and so on. A range of fonts with the character set of the ISO/IEC 8859 series were also made. A large font distributed in 2003 was named "Everson Mono Unicode", but since 2008 the font has been named simply "Everson Mono". At present, there are regular, italic, bold, and bold-italic styles.

Range, characters, version 
Everson Mono version 7.0.0, dated 2014-12-04, contains 9,632 characters  (9,659 glyphs). Previous major releases contained fewer characters: version 6.2.1, dated 2012-12-09, contained 9,288 characters  (9,314 glyphs); version 5.1.5, dated 2008-12-07, contained 6,343 characters (6,350 glyphs); version 4.1.3, dated 2003-02-13, contained 4,893 characters (4,899 glyphs).

In short, this font covers following scripts: Armenian, Canadian Syllabics, Cherokee, Cyrillic, Georgian, Greek (excepting Coptic), Hebrew, Latin, Ogham, Runic, see below for details.

Licensing
Everson Mono is offered without restriction from Everson's Web site. To use the font in any substantial way for personal or commercial purposes, Everson requires a €25.00 license fee, which covers up to three computers; anyone seeking to redistribute the font must seek express  personal permission from Everson, and any use of the font on more than three computers also requires a custom license. Everson forbids any and all derivative works or alterations of the font.

See also
 List of typefaces
 Unicode typefaces (Information and comparison on major fonts)

References

External links

 Evertype: Everson Mono

Humanist sans-serif typefaces
Monospaced typefaces
Unicode typefaces
Typefaces and fonts introduced in 1995